The 2020 World Para Swimming European Open Championships took place in Funchal, Portugal from 16 to 22 May 2021. It was the sixth edition of the championships. The event was postponed in 2020 due to COVID-19 pandemic.

Schedule
158 scheduled events took place.

Medal table
After Day 7

Broken records

Participating nations
The championships served as a qualifier for the 2020 Summer Paralympics. Not only were there European countries competing, some South American and Asian countries also took part because the games were an open championship.

 (1)
 (4)
 (2)
 (11)
 (5)
 (1)
 (3)
 (2)
 (8)
 (2)
 (1)
 (11)
 (2)
 (3)
 (5)
 (16)
 (2)
 (16)
 (9)
 (15)
 (10)
 (2)
 (5)
 (9)
 (29)
 (6)
 (1)
 (3)
 (1)
 (3)
 (1)
 (3)
 (2)
 (15)
 (8)
Refugee Para Team (1)
 (2)
 (43)
 (4)
 (1)
 (1)
 (41)
 (8)
 (4)
 (7)
 (43)
 (1)

See also
2020 European Aquatics Championships
2020 World Para Athletics European Championships held in Bydgoszcz, Poland.

References

World Para Swimming European Championships
2021 in disability sport
2021 in swimming
International sports competitions hosted by Portugal
World Para Swimming European Open Championships
World Para Swimming European Open Championships